The 1917 Chicago Maroons football team was an American football team that represented the University of Chicago during the 1917 college football season. In their 26th season under head coach Amos Alonzo Stagg, the Maroons compiled a 3–2–1 record, finished in sixth place in the Big Ten Conference, and outscored their opponents by a combined total of 82 to 51.

Schedule

References

Chicago
Chicago Maroons football seasons
Chicago Maroons football